White Lake Grasslands Protected Area is a protected area located in the Regional District of Okanagan-Similkameen of British Columbia, Canada. It was established on April 18, 2001 by order-in-council under the Environment and Land Use Act to protect the semi-arid grassland and pine forest ecosystem west of Vaseux Lake.

See also
Lac du Bois Grasslands Protected Area
South Okanagan—Similkameen National Park Reserve

References

External links
White Lake Grasslands Protected Area Map, BC Parks

Provincial parks of British Columbia
Regional District of Okanagan-Similkameen
Protected areas established in 2001
2001 establishments in British Columbia